Bùi Thị Nhung (born 21 January 1983 in Hải Phòng) is a Vietnamese high jumper. Her personal best jump is 1.94 metres, achieved in June 2005 in Bangkok.

She won the gold medal at the 2003 Asian Championships, and finished fourth at the 2006 Asian Games. She also competed at the 2004 Olympic Games without reaching the final.

Achievements

References

External links
 

1983 births
Living people
Vietnamese female high jumpers
Athletes (track and field) at the 2004 Summer Olympics
Olympic athletes of Vietnam
People from Haiphong
Athletes (track and field) at the 2006 Asian Games
Southeast Asian Games medalists in athletics
Southeast Asian Games gold medalists for Vietnam
Southeast Asian Games silver medalists for Vietnam
Competitors at the 2003 Southeast Asian Games
Competitors at the 2005 Southeast Asian Games
Competitors at the 2007 Southeast Asian Games
Competitors at the 2009 Southeast Asian Games
Asian Games competitors for Vietnam
21st-century Vietnamese women
20th-century Vietnamese women